The 1980 Florida State Seminoles baseball team represented Florida State University in the 1980 NCAA Division I baseball season. The Seminoles played their home games at Seminole Field. The team was coached by Mike Martin in his first season as head coach at Florida State.

The Seminoles reached the College World Series, their seventh appearance in Omaha, where they finished tied for seventh place after recording losses to eventual runner-up Hawaii and eventual champion Arizona.

Personnel

Roster

Coaches

Schedule and results

Notes

References

Florida State Seminoles baseball seasons
Florida State Seminoles
College World Series seasons
Florida State Seminoles baseball